Nannestad is a municipality in Akershus in Viken county, Norway.  It is part of the traditional region of Romerike.  The administrative centre of the municipality is the village of Teigebyen.

History
Nannestad was established as a municipality on 1 January 1838 (see formannskapsdistrikt).

Store norske leksikon writes that "At søndre Låke gård (a farm), South of Nannestad Church, Skule Bårdsson beat Birkebeinar (a political group), [... on a battlefield] South of the farm".

Name and coat-of-arms
The municipality (originally the parish) is named after the old Nannestad farm (Old Norse: Nannastaðir), since the first church was built here.  The first element is the genitive case of Nanni (an old Norse male name) and the last element is staðir which means "homestead" or "farm".

The coat-of-arms is from modern times.  They were granted in 1990.  The arms show three yellow coltsfoot flowers on a green background.  This is a flower that is prevalent in the area.

Geography 
Nannestad is located in northwestern Viken county, with inhabitants concentrated at Romerikssletta. It includes the villages of Maura, Åsgreina, Eltonåsen, Steinsgård and Teigebyen, that last being the administrative centre.

Demographics 

In 2017, 539 inhabitants had Polish parents and/or were Polish (themselves); 239 had Lithuanian parents and/or were Lithuanian.

Notable people 

 Hans Georg Jacob Stang (1830 in Nannestad – 1907) a Norwegian attorney and Norway's Prime Minister in Stockholm from 1888–1889
 Oluf Wesmann-Kjær (1874 in Nannestad – 1945) a shooter, competed at the 1920 &  1924 Summer Olympics
 Olaf Helset (1892 in Nannestad – 1960) an Army Major General and sports administrator
 Håkon Christie (1922 in Nannestad – 2010) an architectural historian, antiquarian and author
 Bjarne Røtterud (1929 in Nannestad – 2011) a Norwegian abstract painter
 Gard Kristiansen (born 1972 in Nannestad) a retired football defender with 269 club caps
 Katrine Moholt (born 1973 in Nannestad) a Norwegian TV personality and singer 
 Sven Atle Kopperud (born 1977 in Nannestad) stage name Silenoz, guitarist, founded the symphonic black metal band Dimmu Borgir in 1993
 Posthum (founded 2004) a black metal band founded by Jon Kristian Skare and Morten Edseth

Gallery

References

External links 
 
 
 Municipal fact sheet from Statistics Norway
 
 Municipality website 

 
Municipalities of Akershus
Municipalities of Viken (county)